Berthe-Evelyne Agbo is a writer from Benin who has published poems in French.

As a young child, Berthe-Evelyne Agbo lived in Saint-Louis, Senegal. She received primary and secondary education in Touraine, France before attending Université de Dakar. She has subsequently lived in France.

Publications

 Emois de femmes (Poèmes, 1980–1982) Sénégal: Les Nouvelles Editions du Sénégal (1997) (47p.) (in French)

References

20th-century poets
Year of birth missing (living people)
Living people
French-language poets
Beninese women poets
Cheikh Anta Diop University alumni
20th-century women writers